The arrondissement of Belley is an arrondissement of France in the Ain department in the Auvergne-Rhône-Alpes region. It has 104 communes.

Composition

The communes of the arrondissement of Belley, and their INSEE codes, are:
 
 L'Abergement-de-Varey (01002)
 Ambérieu-en-Bugey (01004)
 Ambléon (01006)
 Ambronay (01007)
 Ambutrix (01008)
 Andert-et-Condon (01009)
 Anglefort (01010)
 Aranc (01012)
 Arandas (01013)
 Arboys-en-Bugey (01015)
 Argis (01017)
 Armix (01019)
 Artemare (01022)
 Arvière-en-Valromey (01453)
 Belley (01034)
 Bénonces (01037)
 Bettant (01041)
 Blyes (01047)
 Bourg-Saint-Christophe (01054)
 Brégnier-Cordon (01058)
 Brens (01061)
 Briord (01064)
 La Burbanche (01066)
 Ceyzérieu (01073)
 Chaley (01076)
 Champagne-en-Valromey (01079)
 Champdor-Corcelles (01080)
 Charnoz-sur-Ain (01088)
 Château-Gaillard (01089)
 Chazey-Bons (01098)
 Chazey-sur-Ain (01099)
 Cheignieu-la-Balme (01100)
 Cleyzieu (01107)
 Colomieu (01110)
 Conand (01111)
 Contrevoz (01116)
 Conzieu (01117)
 Corbonod (01118)
 Corlier (01121)
 Cressin-Rochefort (01133)
 Culoz-Béon (01138)
 Cuzieu (01141)
 Douvres (01149)
 Évosges (01155)
 Faramans (01156)
 Flaxieu (01162)
 Groslée-Saint-Benoît (01338)
 Haut-Valromey (01187)
 Innimond (01190)
 Izieu (01193)
 Joyeux (01198)
 Lagnieu (01202)
 Lavours (01208)
 Leyment (01213)
 Lhuis (01216)
 Lompnas (01219)
 Loyettes (01224)
 Magnieu (01227)
 Marchamp (01233)
 Marignieu (01234)
 Massignieu-de-Rives (01239)
 Meximieux (01244)
 Montagnieu (01255)
 Le Montellier (01260)
 Murs-et-Gélignieux (01268)
 Nivollet-Montgriffon (01277)
 Oncieu (01279)
 Ordonnaz (01280)
 Parves-et-Nattages (01286)
 Pérouges (01290)
 Peyrieu (01294)
 Plateau d'Hauteville (01185)
 Pollieu (01302)
 Prémeyzel (01310)
 Prémillieu (01311)
 Rignieux-le-Franc (01325)
 Rossillon (01329)
 Ruffieu (01330)
 Saint-Denis-en-Bugey (01345)
 Sainte-Julie (01366)
 Saint-Éloi (01349)
 Saint-Germain-les-Paroisses (01358)
 Saint-Jean-de-Niost (01361)
 Saint-Martin-de-Bavel (01372)
 Saint-Maurice-de-Gourdans (01378)
 Saint-Maurice-de-Rémens (01379)
 Saint-Rambert-en-Bugey (01384)
 Saint-Sorlin-en-Bugey (01386)
 Saint-Vulbas (01390)
 Sault-Brénaz (01396)
 Seillonnaz (01400)
 Serrières-de-Briord (01403)
 Seyssel (01407)
 Souclin (01411)
 Talissieu (01415)
 Tenay (01416)
 Torcieu (01421)
 Valromey-sur-Séran (01036)
 Vaux-en-Bugey (01431)
 Villebois (01444)
 Villieu-Loyes-Mollon (01450)
 Virieu-le-Grand (01452)
 Virignin (01454)
 Vongnes (01456)

History

The arrondissement of Belley was created in 1800. At the January 2017 reorganization of the arrondissements of Ain, it received 12 communes from the arrondissement of Bourg-en-Bresse and one from the arrondissement of Nantua, and it lost one commune to the arrondissement of Nantua.

As a result of the reorganisation of the cantons of France which came into effect in 2015, the borders of the cantons are no longer related to the borders of the arrondissements. The cantons of the arrondissement of Belley were, as of January 2015:

 Ambérieu-en-Bugey
 Belley
 Champagne-en-Valromey
 Hauteville-Lompnes
 Lagnieu
 Lhuis
 Saint-Rambert-en-Bugey
 Seyssel
 Virieu-le-Grand

References

Belley